The Xiamen–Chongqing corridor is a high-speed rail corridor and one of the eight north–south routes in China's 8 horizontals and 8 verticals system.

Route

References

High-speed rail in China